Carlos Martinho Gomes (born 18 October 1926) is a former Portuguese footballer who played as forward.

See also
Football in Portugal

References

External links 
 
 

1926 births
Possibly living people
Portuguese footballers
Association football forwards
Primeira Liga players
Portugal international footballers